Robert, Bobby or Bob Campbell may refer to:

Politics

Canada
 Robert Campbell (Nova Scotia politician) (1718–1775), merchant and political figure in Nova Scotia
 Robert Campbell (Canadian politician) (1818–1887), Canadian lumber merchant and politician
 Robert Campbell (Alberta politician) (1871–1965), member of the Legislative Assembly of Alberta
 Robert Adam Campbell (fl. 1894–1899), lumber merchant and politician from Ontario, Canada
 Robert Campbell (Prince Edward Island politician) (1922–1992)

U.K.
 Robert Campbell (Scottish politician), MP for Argyllshire, 1766–1772
 Robert James Roy Campbell (1813–1862), British Member of Parliament for Weymouth and Melcombe Regis
 Robert Campbell (Liberal politician) (died 1887), MP for Helston 1866
 Robert Campbell (Northern Ireland politician), MPA for North Down, 1973–1974

U.S.
 Robert B. Campbell (fl. 1809–1862), U.S. Representative from South Carolina
 Robert Campbell (New York politician) (1808–1870), American politician
 Robert Campbell (Wisconsin politician) (1841–?), member of the Wisconsin State Assembly
 Robert Alexander Campbell, lieutenant governor of Missouri, 1881–1885
 Robert A. Campbell (mayor) (1865–1947), mayor of Ann Arbor, Michigan 1925–1927
 Robert Campbell (California politician) (1937–2020), member of the California state assembly
 Robert M. Campbell (1935–1988), Justice of the Supreme Court of Texas
 Robert Campbell (artist) (1951–2004), a painter, poet, and publisher
 Robert P. Campbell (born 1979), Co-host of the Untitled Linux Show on Club Twit.

Elsewhere
 Robert Campbell (1769–1846), Australian merchant/politician from New South Wales
 Robert Campbell (Australian politician) (1804–1859), New South Wales politician
 Robert Campbell (New Zealand politician) (1843–1889), New Zealand politician

Sports

Football and rugby
 Bob Campbell (Australian footballer) (1868–1946), for St. Kilda Football Club
 Robert Campbell (football manager) (fl. 1896–1905), Scottish manager of Bristol City and first Bradford City side
 Robert Campbell (footballer, born 1882) (1882–1931), with Partick Thistle, Rangers and Bradford City
 Robert Campbell (footballer, born 1883) (1883–1942), Celtic and Rangers
 Bob Campbell (soccer) (fl. 1926–1930), Scottish-American
 Bobby Campbell (footballer, born 1922) (1922–2009), with Chelsea and Reading and manager of Dumbarton and Bristol Rovers
 Bobby Campbell (footballer, born 1941) (1941–2019), Scottish footballer - Motherwell 
 Bobby Campbell (English footballer) (1937–2015), with Liverpool and manager of Portsmouth, Fulham and Chelsea
 Bob Campbell (American football) (born 1947), wide receiver
 Bobby Campbell (Northern Irish footballer) (1956–2016), with Bradford City, capped twice for his country
 Bobby Campbell (Scottish footballer) (born c. 1938), Scottish footballer - St Mirren
 Robert Campbell (rugby league) (born 1971), Australian who also played internationally for Russia
 Robert Campbell (Australian rules footballer) (born 1982), for the Hawthorn Football Club
 Robert Campbell (footballer, born 1986), Scottish footballer with East Fife F.C.

Other sports
 Earl Campbell (ice hockey) or (Robert Earl Campbell (1900–1953), Canadian ice hockey player
 Robert Campbell (curler) (born 1966), Canadian curler

Other
 Robert C. Campbell (1885–1966), British POW when the Kaiser allowed him to visit his dying mother
 Robert Campbell of Glenlyon (1630–1696), Scottish officer implicated in the Massacre of Glencoe
 Robert Campbell (frontiersman) (1804–1879), 19th century Irish-American frontiersman, and businessman in St. Louis, Missouri
 Robert Campbell (fur trader) (1808–1894), fur trader of the Hudson's Bay Company and explorer of the Yukon
 Robert Campbell (advocate) (1814–1868), advocate, hymn writer and translator
 Robert Orr Campbell (1815–1892), Madras businessman who served as a non-official member of the Madras Legislative Council
 Robert Campbell (bishop) (1884–1977), bishop of the Episcopal Diocese of Liberia
 Robert Campbell (art gallery director) (1902–1972), Australian painter and director of State art Galleries in the mid twentieth century
 Robert Wright Campbell (1927–2000), American screenwriter, author and actor
 Bob Campbell (photographer) (1930–2014), wildlife photographer and filmmaker
 Robert Campbell (journalist) (born 1937), architecture journalist with the Boston Globe
 Bobbi Campbell or Robert Boyle Campbell Jr. (1952–1984), American AIDS activist
 Rob Campbell (fl. 1990s–2010s), American actor
 Robert Campbell (colonist) (1829–1884), Jamaican-born American settler in Lagos (modern-day Nigeria)

See also
Robert A. Campbell (disambiguation)